Malin Gerdin (born 12 March 1993) is a Swedish synchronized swimmer.
She won the Swedish "synchronized swimmer of the year" award four times.

Career records
Solo
2011, Junior European Championships, Belgrade, 11th
2012, European Championships, Debrecen, 13th
2013, World Championships, Barcelona, 22nd

Duet
2012, Summer Olympics, London, 30th

References

1993 births
Living people
Swedish synchronized swimmers
Synchronized swimmers at the 2017 World Aquatics Championships